Tacy sami is a 1988 album by Lady Pank.

Lyrics by:
Grzegorz Ciechowski (Zostawcie Titanica)
Zbigniew Hołdys (Mała wojna)
Jacek Skubikowski (Tacy sami)

Musicians
Jan Borysewicz - lead guitar, vocals
Janusz Panasewicz - vocals
Edmund Stasiak - rhythm guitar,
Paweł Mścisławski - bass guitar,
Wiesław Gola - drums (only track 4 and 8)
Jerzy Suchocki - keyboards (some tracks)
Rafał Paczkowski - keyboards (some tracks), drum machine (some tracks)

Songs
 "Tacy Sami"
 "Oglądamy film" 
 "John Belushi" 
 "Mała wojna"  
 "Giga - giganci" 
 "To co mam" 
 "Zostawcie Titanica" 
 "Ratuj tylko mnie" 
 "Martwy postój"

1988 albums
Lady Pank albums